In linguistics, approbatives are words or grammatical forms that denote a positive affect; that is, they express the appreciation or approval of the speaker. Sometimes a term may begin as a pejorative word and eventually be adopted in an approbative sense. In historical linguistics, this phenomenon is known as amelioration. Examples from English include "punk", "nerd", "badass", "sick", and "killer".

See also

Laudative, or praising affect
Pejorative, or negative affect

Connotation